Andalas State Polytechnics (or Andalas Polytechnics, formerly named: Padang State Polytechnics and Polytechnics of Andalas University) is a higher education institution in Padang, West Sumatra, Indonesia.

Overview
Andalas State Polytechnics provides vocational education aimed at granting Expert associate degrees ( or A.Md.).

The dynamic curriculum is designed according to the needs of the industry and commerce sectors.

Studies and study programmes
There are 12 Diploma-3 study programmes and 7 Diploma-4 study programmes, spread over 7 studies, including:

References

External links 
 

Colleges in Indonesia